Lewis Germaine (1 March 1935 – 8 April 1992) was an Australian cricketer. He played eight first-class cricket matches for Victoria between 1957 and 1960.

See also
 List of Victoria first-class cricketers
 List of Western Australia first-class cricketers

References

External links
 

1935 births
1992 deaths
Australian cricketers
Victoria cricketers
Western Australia cricketers
Cricketers from Melbourne